Adam Neff (born May 30, 2001) is an American tennis player.

Neff made his ATP main draw debut at the 2022 Dallas Open after receiving a wildcard into the doubles main draw with Ivan Thamma.

Neff played college tennis at North Carolina in his freshman year before transferring to SMU.

References

External links

2001 births
Living people
American male tennis players
Sportspeople from Bradenton, Florida
North Carolina Tar Heels men's tennis players
SMU Mustangs men's tennis players
Tennis people from Florida